Myeongho-myeon (Hangeul: 명호면, Hanja: 明湖面) is a myeon or a township in Bonghwa county of North Gyeongsang province in South Korea. The total area of Myeongho-myeon is 114.38 square kilometers, and, as of 2006, the population was 2,428 people. Myeongho-myeon is further divided into eight "ri", or small villages.

Cheongnyang Mountain Provincial Park is within Myeongho-myeon and is home to the famous Cheongnyang Temple and Mountain.

Administrative divisions
Docheon-ri (도천리)
Samdong-ri (삼동리)
Yanggok-ri (양곡리)
Gogam-ri (고감리)
Pungho-ri (풍호리)
Gogye-ri (고계리)
Bukgok-ri (북곡리)
Gwanchang-ri (관창리)

Schools
Myeongho Elementary School(명호초등학교) in Docheon-ri with a branch facility in Bukgok-ri.
Myeongho Middle School (명호중학교) in Docheon-ri.

References

External links 
 Myeongho-myeon Office Homepage
 Tourist Map of Bonghwa county including Myeongho-myeon

Bonghwa County
Towns and townships in North Gyeongsang Province